Connecticut became a U.S. state in 1788, which allowed it to send  congressional delegations to the United States Senate and United States House of Representatives beginning with the 1st United States Congress in 1789. Each state elects two senators to serve for six years, and members of the House to two-year terms.

These are tables of congressional delegations from Connecticut to the United States Senate and the United States House of Representatives.

Current delegation 

Connecticut's current congressional delegation in the  consists of its two senators and its five representatives, all of whom are Democrats.

United States Senate

United States House of Representatives

1789–1793: 5 seats 
Connecticut was granted five seats in the House until the first US census in 1790.

1793–1823: 7 seats 
Following 1790 census, Connecticut was apportioned seven seats.

1823–1843: 6 seats 
Following 1820 census, Connecticut was apportioned six seats.

1843–1903: 4 seats 
Following 1840 census, Connecticut was apportioned four seats.

1903–1933: 5 seats 
Following 1900 census, Connecticut was apportioned five seats.

1933–2003: 6 seats
Following 1930 census, Connecticut was apportioned six seats.

2003–present: 5 seats 
Following 2000 census, Connecticut was apportioned five seats.

Key

See also

List of United States congressional districts
Connecticut's congressional districts
Political party strength in Connecticut

References 

 
 
Connecticut
Politics of Connecticut
Congressional delegations